These are the results of the women's K-1 500 metres competition in canoeing at the 2004 Summer Olympics.  The K-1 event is raced by single-person canoe sprint kayaks.

Medalists

Heats
The 23 competitors first raced in three heats.  The top finisher in each heat moved directly to the final, and the next 6 finishers in each heat qualified for the two semifinal races.  Therefore, only two kayakers were eliminated in the heats.  The heats were raced on August 24.

Sergeyeva was disqualified for not keeping her boat in the automatic starting system, delaying the race start by five minutes. She was also disqualified for starting outside of the automatic starting system.

Semifinals
The top three finishers in each of the two semifinals qualified for the final.  Fourth place and higher competitors were eliminated.   The semifinals were raced on August 26.

Pastuszka was disqualified for competing in an underweight boat.

Final
The final was raced on August 28.

Janics, who switched her nationality from Serbia and Montenegro to Hungary three months before the 2004 Games, jumped to an early lead and then held off a late challenge from defending Olympic champion Idem.

References
2004 Summer Olympics Canoe sprint results 
Sports-reference.com 2004 women's K-1 500 m results.
Wallechinsky, David and Jamie Loucky (2008). "Canoeing: Women's Kayak Singles 500 Meters". In The Complete Book of the Olympics: 2008 Edition. London: Aurum Press Limited. p. 492.
Yahoo! Sports Athens 2004 Summer Olympics Canoe/Kayak Results

Women's K-1 500
Olymp
Women's events at the 2004 Summer Olympics